Linda Shayne is an American-Canadian dual citizen, film and television writer and director, and former film and television actress.

Early life
Linda Shayne was born in the United States. Shayne graduated from the University of California at Berkeley with highest honors and her published work includes a journal article about ex-offenders from San Quentin Prison. She also attended the American Academy of Dramatic Arts.

Career
Shayne's feature film credits include Purple People Eater (writer, director, and producer), Flyin' Ryan (writer, director, and producer), Crystal Heart (writer), Little Ghost (director), and The Undercover Kid (director). Shayne wrote and directed the award-winning short suspense thriller Mirror Image (director) in 2019.

Shayne's other film credits include Out of Bounds (actress), No Man's Land (actress), Graduation Day (actress), Humanoids from the Deep (actress), Screwballs (writer and actress), and Lovely But Deadly (actress). Her television series credits include Archie Bunker's Place (actress), Hill Street Blues (actress), The Tonight Show Starring Johnny Carson (actress), The Secret World of Alex Mack (director), and Starla and the Jewel Riders (writer).

Shayne has also had film writing development deals with Walt Disney Studios, Showtime Networks, and Brian Grazer, and she has served on the judging panel for the British film festival ShropFilm48.
Linda Shayne created a TV series to film in Thailand and served as a Judge for the Content Asia Awards.

Emmy Award winning animator Art Leonardi illustrated a children's book Linda Shayne wrote, Longfellow Finds a Home.

References

External links

Linda Shayne's website 

American film directors
American women film directors
American film actresses
American television actresses
American television writers
American women screenwriters
American screenwriters
Living people
University of California, Berkeley alumni
American women television writers
Year of birth missing (living people)
21st-century American women